Baudouin de Brabandère (19 February 1894 – 22 July 1947) was a Belgian equestrian. He competed at the 1924 Summer Olympics and the 1928 Summer Olympics.

References

External links
 

1894 births
1947 deaths
Belgian male equestrians
Olympic equestrians of Belgium
Equestrians at the 1924 Summer Olympics
Equestrians at the 1928 Summer Olympics
People from Ixelles
Sportspeople from Brussels
20th-century Belgian people